Rollin Menayese (born 4 December 1997) is a Welsh professional footballer who plays as a defender for League Two side Hartlepool United on loan from Walsall.

Having begun his career with Non-League side Weston-super-Mare, he has gone on to feature professionally for Bristol Rovers, Swindon Town, Mansfield Town and Grimsby Town.

Early life
Menayese was born in the Democratic Republic of the Congo, and attended St Joseph's Roman Catholic High School in Newport.

Career

Weston-super-Mare
Menayese began his career in the youth academy at Cardiff City along with his twin brother Elvis. Following his release by Cardiff, he signed for Weston-super-Mare in December 2016. He made 23 appearances for the Seagulls in the second half of the 2016–17 season.

Bristol Rovers

On the 1 June 2017, Menayese joined Bristol Rovers, initially joining up with the u23 squad. He made his first professional appearance for Rovers in the EFL Trophy, coming off the bench to replace an injured Jonathan Burn in a 5–1 victory over Wycombe Wanderers. On 7 October 2017, with both Tom Lockyer and Ryan Sweeney on international duty Menayese made his first league start in a 6–0 away victory over Northampton town. He made his second appearance for the club when Lockyer and Sweeney were again on International Duty in a late 1–0 away defeat to Scunthorpe United and then came off the bench to replace Chris Lines in the 68th minute of a 3–1 away victory at Doncaster Rovers on 27 January 2018, 4 days before he joined Swindon on loan.

At the end of the 2018–19 season, Bristol Rovers exercised a contract extension for him.

On 1 June 2020 after somewhat of a breakthrough season, Menayese signed a one-year contract extension.

On 31 January 2018, Menayese joined League Two side Swindon Town on loan for the remainder of the campaign. He made his debut for the club on 3 February 2018, coming off the bench in a dramatic 2–2 draw with Lincoln City. He came on to replace striker Luke Norris in the 24th minute of the match.

On 1 February 2019, Menayese joined National League side Aldershot Town on loan until the end of the season.

Mansfield Town
On 28 July 2020, Menayese re-joined former manager Graham Coughlan at Mansfield Town, joining for an undisclosed fee. Menayese made his debut for the club on 5 September 2020 in a 4–0 EFL Cup defeat to Preston North End and made his league debut the following week on the opening day of the season, playing the duration of a 0–0 draw with Tranmere Rovers. On 26 September 2020, Menayese scored his first goal for the club and the first of his career, opening the scoring in a 2–1 home defeat to Exeter City. He played fourteen games in total for Mansfield, including 10 league games. He scored twice, once in the aforementioned Exeter City game, and once in a 3–1 home defeat to Lincoln City.

On 18 January 2021, Menayese joined League Two club Grimsby Town on loan for the rest of the 2020–21 season. He started the next game, against fierce rivals, Scunthorpe United. He played the full 90 minutes in a 3–0 defeat. He started every game for Grimsby, except a 2–2 draw against his parent club. Grimsby finished bottom and were relegated to the National League.

Walsall
On 16 July 2021, Menayese joined Walsall on a season-long loan. He made his debut for Walsall in a 0–0 draw against Doncaster Rovers in the EFL Cup. He played the full 90 minutes, but did not take a penalty in the penalty shootout. He made his league debut in a 1–1 draw against Scunthorpe. He played a further 23 games (25 in total) while on loan at Walsall.

On 4 January 2022, following a successful loan spell, Walsall made the loan a permanent transfer. Menayese signed a contract until 2024.

Hartlepool United (loan)
On 18 July 2022, Menayese joined fellow League Two club Hartlepool United on a season-long loan deal. He scored for Hartlepool in a 2–0 win at Crawley Town. Menayese scored again in a 2–1 win at Rochdale. In January 2023, Menayese was ruled out for the rest of the season due to an ankle injury following a strong challenge in a defeat to Carlisle United.

Career statistics

References

Living people
1997 births
Welsh footballers
Wales youth international footballers
Democratic Republic of the Congo footballers
Democratic Republic of the Congo emigrants to Wales
Cardiff City F.C. players
Weston-super-Mare A.F.C. players
Bristol Rovers F.C. players
Swindon Town F.C. players
Aldershot Town F.C. players
Mansfield Town F.C. players
Grimsby Town F.C. players
Walsall F.C. players
Hartlepool United F.C. players
National League (English football) players
English Football League players
Association football defenders